The North Texas Junior College Athletic Conference (NTJCAC) is a junior college athletic conference for many technical and community colleges in the state of Texas, sponsored by the National Junior College Athletic Association (NJCAA). Conference championships are held in most sports and individuals can be named to All-Conference and All-Academic teams. It is part of NJCAA Region 5.

Member schools

Current members
The NTJCAC currently has 11 full members, all but one are public schools:

Notes

See also
 National Junior College Athletic Association (NJCAA)
 Western Junior College Athletic Conference, also in Region 5
 Metro Athletic Conference, also in Region 5

External links
 NJCAA Region 5 website
 NJCAA website

NJCAA conferences
College sports in Texas